Hermann Kopf (May 29, 1901 – May 5, 1991) was a German politician of the Christian Democratic Union (CDU) and former member of the German Bundestag.

Life 
He was a member of the German Bundestag from its first election in 1949 to 1969. He was directly elected in all ballots in the Freiburg constituency. From 25 May 1960 to 1969 he was Chairman of the Bundestag Committee on Foreign Affairs.

From 16 July 1952 to 29 November 1961, Kopf was also a member of the European Parliament.

Literature

References

1901 births
1991 deaths
Members of the Bundestag for Baden-Württemberg
Members of the Bundestag 1965–1969
Members of the Bundestag 1961–1965
Members of the Bundestag 1957–1961
Members of the Bundestag 1953–1957
Members of the Bundestag 1949–1953
Members of the Bundestag for the Christian Democratic Union of Germany
Christian Democratic Union of Germany MEPs
MEPs for Germany 1958–1979
Grand Crosses with Star and Sash of the Order of Merit of the Federal Republic of Germany